FC Rohatyn was a professional Ukrainian football club from Rohatyn, Rohatyn Raion, Ivano-Frankivsk Oblast. The club played in the Ukrainian Second League from the 2000–01 season until they withdrew after the 2004–05 season.

Honors
 Ukrainian Amateur Championships
 Runners-up 1999

Ivano-Frankivsk Oblast Championship
 Champions 1999 (autumn)

League and cup history

{|class="wikitable"
|-bgcolor="#efefef"
! Season
! Div.
! Pos.
! Pl.
! W
! D
! L
! GS
! GA
! P
!Domestic Cup
!colspan=2|Europe
!Notes
|-  	
|align=center|2000–01
|align=center|3rd "A"
|align=center|6
|align=center|30
|align=center|16
|align=center|2
|align=center|12
|align=center|44
|align=center|32
|align=center|50
|align=center|
|align=center|
|align=center|
|align=center|
|-  	
|align=center|2001–02
|align=center|3rd "A"
|align=center|8
|align=center|36
|align=center|16
|align=center|6
|align=center|14
|align=center|53
|align=center|58
|align=center|54
|align=center|
|align=center|
|align=center|
|align=center|
|-  	
|align=center|2002–03
|align=center|3rd "A"
|align=center|11
|align=center|28
|align=center|7
|align=center|7
|align=center|14
|align=center|23
|align=center|35
|align=center|28
|align=center|
|align=center|
|align=center|
|align=center|
|-
|align=center|2003–04
|align=center|3rd "A"
|align=center|4
|align=center|30
|align=center|16
|align=center|6
|align=center|8
|align=center|39
|align=center|29
|align=center|54
|align=center|
|align=center|
|align=center|
|align=center|
|-
|align=center|2004–05
|align=center|3rd "A"
|align=center|8
|align=center|28
|align=center|12
|align=center|6
|align=center|10
|align=center|33
|align=center|29
|align=center|42
|align=center|
|align=center|
|align=center|
|align=center|
|}

References

External links
  Fannet team information

 
Defunct football clubs in Ukraine
Sport in Rohatyn
Football clubs in Ivano-Frankivsk Oblast
Association football clubs established in 1998
Association football clubs disestablished in 2005
1998 establishments in Ukraine
2005 disestablishments in Ukraine